Dana Michelle Gourrier is an American actress, known for her roles as Cora in the film Django Unchained (2012), and as Minnie Mink in The Hateful Eight (2015), both directed by Quentin Tarantino.

Filmography

Films

TV series

Video games

References

External links
 
 

21st-century American actresses
Living people
American film actresses
Actresses from New Orleans
University of Louisiana at Lafayette alumni
California Institute of the Arts alumni
Year of birth missing (living people)